There is a small community of Japanese expatriates in Jamaica and their descendants (known as Japanese Jamaicans), consisting mostly of corporate employees and their families, along with immigrants and Jamaican-born citizens of Japanese ancestry. , 158 Japanese lived in the country, according to the statistics of Japan's Ministry of Foreign Affairs.

History
According to the Jamaican Embassy in Tokyo website, more than 100,000 Japanese tourists have visited Jamaica in the last 15 years.

Culture
Mighty Crown was inspired by the legendary sound systems like Killamanjaro and Saxon. They were the first non-Jamaican sound system to win the Irish and Chin world clash in 1999.

Notable people
 Musashi Suzuki - Jamaican-born Japanese footballer
 Asuka Cambridge - Japanese sprinter

References

External links
 Jamaipanese

 
Asian Jamaican
Ethnic groups in Jamaica
Japanese Caribbean
Jamaica